A monk shoe or monk strap is a style of dress shoe with no lacing, instead secured on the feet by one or multiple buckles and straps. It is a moderately formal shoe: less formal than a full Oxford (American: Balmoral); but more so than an open Derby (American: Blücher). In between these, it is one of the main categories of men's shoes.

It often has a cap toe, is occasionally brogued, and is popular in suede.

See also
 List of shoe styles

Footnotes

Shoes

pt:Sapato clássico#Monk